Florence Olivia Tunks (19 July 1891 – 22 February 1985) was a militant suffragette and member of the Women's Social and Political Union (WSPU) who with Hilda Burkitt engaged in a campaign of arson in Suffolk in 1914 for which they both received prison sentences.

Florence Tunks was born in Newport in Monmouthshire in 1891, the eldest of four daughters of Gilbert Samuel Tunks (1863–1933), an engineer, and Elizabeth "Bessie" Ann née Hall (1866–1947). From at least 1894 to 1911 the family were living in Cardiff in Wales where Gilbert Tunks ran a mechanical and electric engineers and oven builders trading as Tunks and Co. The 1911 Census for Cardiff lists Florence Tunks as a bookkeeper and she was still a bookkeeper when she was living with her parents and three sisters at 20 Bisham Gardens in Highgate.

At some time around 1914 Tunks joined the Women's Social and Political Union and became a militant suffragette. In April 1914 Tunks with her fellow-suffragette Hilda Burkitt burnt down two wheat stacks at Bucklesham Farm valued at £340, the Pavilion at the Britannia Pier in Great Yarmouth and the Bath Hotel in Felixstowe, causing £35,000 of damage to the latter as part of the campaign for women's suffrage. There were no occupants in either the Pavilion or the hotel. The two women refused to answer questions in Court and sat on a table chatting throughout the proceedings with their backs to the magistrates. For her actions Tunks received a nine-month sentence which she served in Holloway Prison.

Florence Tunks studied for a certificate in nursing between 1915 and 1918 at the Derbyshire Royal Infirmary in Derby and qualified as a nurse in London in 1923. In 1946 she is listed on the Nursing Register as living with her widowed mother in the family home at Bisham Gardens in Highgate. Her parents are buried together in Highgate Cemetery. She never married and died in Glindon Nursing Home on Lewes Road in Eastbourne, East Sussex in 1985 aged 93.

In 2014 The Felixstowe Society unveiled a plaque commemorating the burning down of the Bath Hotel in Felixstowe by Hilda Burkitt and Tunks in 1914. The plaque commemorates the centenary of the burning down of the hotel and is on what remains of the building, at the site of the former Bartlet Hospital.

Please note this photograph featured in the biography is not of Florence Tunks but is of her fellow suffragette militant Evaline Hilda Burkitt. This photograph was taken during their trial at Felixstowes' Magistrates Court where they stood accused of torching the towns's Bath Hotel in 1914. I sourced this photograph during the research for my book 'Felixstowe's Last Bath Night (A tale of Two Suffragettes)' and published it alongside the correct photograph of Florence Tunks in the publication. Infact a good deal of the information and photographs etc attributed to others over the years regarding the lives of Hilda Burkitt and Florence Tunks would have been lifted from my book which sadly has not been credited or recognised on many of these occasions.I do also have real photographs of Florence in later life should anyone wish to contact me. Wayne Bennett

References

1891 births
1985 deaths
People from Newport, Wales
Bookkeepers
English suffragettes
English feminists
British women's rights activists
English nurses
Women's Social and Political Union
Prisoners and detainees of England and Wales
British women nurses